Jill B. Becker is an American psychological researcher, studying sex differences in addiction using preclinical models. Becker is the Biopsychology Area Chair and the Patricia Y. Gurin Professor of Psychology at University of Michigan..She has advocated for greater research into sex/gender differences, particularly in the area of Substance Use Disorder.

Biography 
Becker received her PhD from the University of Illinois. 

In 2016, she received the Ting-Kai Li Lecture Award from the Research Society on Alcoholism. In 2019, she was invited to deliver the Neal Miller Distinguished Lecture by the American Psychological Association.

Selected publications

References 

University of Michigan faculty
Year of birth missing (living people)
Living people
University of Illinois alumni